Ilan Manouach (Athens, 1980) is an artist with a specific interest in conceptual and post-digital
comics and is also active as a music performer, composer and a book publisher and has produced a few commissions for newspapers such as The New York Times and :it:Internazionale (periodico). He currently holds a PhD researcher position at the New Media Programme of the Aalto University in Helsinki (adv. Craig Dworkin) where he examines the intersections of contemporary comics, art and poetry. His work and research claims for the importance of comics as a materially self-reflexive medium, unaffiliated to any general art history. He has more than twenty published books, most of them published in the catalog of :fr:La Cinquième Couche, and he has also produced solo exhibitions to important comics festivals, museums and galleries worldwide. His work has been written about in Hyperallergic, The Cut, World Literature Today, Wired, Le Monde, The Comics Journal, du9, 50 watts, Kenneth Goldsmith’s Wasting Time on the Internet and his works are also part of the UbuWeb online contemporary art archive.

Conceptual comics
Ilan Manouach holds a BFA from École supérieure des arts Saint-Luc in Brussels. Since 2003, he has published more than a dozen books under the catalogue of a small publishing house based in Brussels, :fr:La Cinquième Couche. He has curated four anthologies bringing together contributions from artists, critics, lawyers and different professionals of the book industry. His work has been described as covering a range of different experimentation within the tradition of comics, from narratives, to rip-offs and appropriations and recently to the invention of a new language, Shapereader.

His first book, published in 2003, was Les lieux et les choses qui entouraient les gens désormais. According to comics critic Thierry Groensteen, « […] It is not surprising that Manouach is also a jazz musician. His storytelling is entirely built as a succession of drone sounds, melodic lines, disjunctions, syncopations and improvisations and variations around a main theme ».

In several later projects such as The Horse-Headed Statue, designed for an international architecture symposium in Greece in 2007, Écologie Forcée, a work commissioned by the :fr:Biennale d'Art contemporain du Havre in 2010 and Both Sides of a Wall, produced for the :fr:Festival de BD à Sierre in 2011, he uses exhibition space as a way to engage the spectator as the reader. Along with :fr:Xavier Löwenthal, he is also the director of the anthology Le Coup de Grâce, a book that collects artists' contributions to book's call for the creation of undetermined, deliberately evasive, and irredeemably idiosyncratic narratives.

His books have received support on different occasions from the :fr:Centre National du Livre in France and the French Community of Belgium. He is a Fellow and an alumnus of the Koneen Säätiö in Finland.

He has also contributed to several anthologies, such as :fr:Frédéric Magazine, :Fr:Éprouvette (collection), Glomp and Multitudes and has produced a few commissions for newspapers such as The New York Times and :it:Internazionale (periodico).

He is known for the unsigned comics appropriations, and the manifestos supplementing these editions.

He has published illegal appropriations of existing comics, and re-injected the detournements in the book market.

Katz
Ilan Manouach is probably the author of the famous rip-off, Katz. Katz is a pirated edition of Art Spiegelman's seminal graphic novel Maus. Katz is an exact copy of the French edition of Maus, with the difference that all the animal characters, have been redrawn as cats. The book was printed on November 2011 and it was seen in public for the first time in January 2012 during the Angoulême International Comics Festival  that ran under Spiegelman’s presidency.

Noirs
Noirs is a fac-simile of the original edition of Les Schroumpfs Noirs, with all printed colors replaced with blue. The book has been compared to certain appropriations from Carmelo Bene's, specifically Romeo e Giulietta : storia di Shakespeare secondo Carmelo Bene.

Shapereader
Shapereader is a tactile language specifically designed to allow the creation of narrative works of tactile literature for, and from a visually impaired readership. While it has been mainly created for the purposes of a blind community, the Shapereader repertoire can also be experienced by the acquainted regular user. The Shapereader consists of a repertoire of anaglyph shapes called tactigrams designed to provide haptic equivalents for objects, actions, affections, characters and so on.

The Shapereader has been presented during the International Comics Festival of Angoulême, at the Onassis Cultural Center in Athens and workshops have been conducted in Athens, Tel Aviv and France.

Bibliography
 Les Lieux et les Choses qui Entouraient les Gens Désormais, La Cinquième Couche, 80 p., Brussels, 2003 
 La Mort du Cycliste, La Cinquième Couche, 56 p., Brussels, 2005 
 Arbres en Plastique, Feuilles en Papier, La Cinquième Couche, 90 p., Brussels, 2006 
 Le Coup de Grâce, La Cinquième Couche, 144 p., Brussels, 2006 
 The Golden Age, Kormoranos, 136 p., Athens, 2007 
 The Horse-Headed Statue, Kormoranos, 26 p., Athens, 2007 
 Frag, La Cinquième Couche, 128 p., Brussels, 2007 
 A Vara do Acucar da Meia Note e nos Bordos dos Peixes, Opuntia Syndrome, 44 p., Lisbon, 2007 
 Limbo Textbook, La Cinquième Couche, 54 p., Brussels, 2010 
 Limbo Sketchbook, La Cinquième Couche, 92 p., Brussels, 2010 
 Ecologie Forcee, Biennale du Havre Ed., 24 p., Havre, 2010 
 We All Go Down #4, SOAP Comics, 16 p., Brussels, 2010 
 Both Sides Of A Wall, SISMICS et Cinquième Couche, 24 p., Sierre, 2011 
 Katz, Dust, 288 p., Brussels, 2012 
 VSAdH / EdWB / IpAN (uDdPK), La Cinquième Couche et Montesinos, 112 p., Brussels/Lisbon, 2012 
 METAKATZ, La Cinquième Couche, 207 p., Brussels, 2013
 Noirs, Unknown publisher, 54p., Brussels, 2014
 Riki Fermier, La Cinquième Couche, 27p., Brussels, 2015  
 Harvested, Hélice Hélas Éditeur, 500 p., Vevey, 2016

Selected discography
 Kocher, Manouach, Papageorgiou [Bruit, 2016]
 Glacial, Hardcore Lounge EP [Equivalence, 2016]
 Glacial, Entropy EP [six dogs, 2015]
 Kocher & Manouach, Skeleton Drafts [Bruit, 2015]
 Romvos, Undeveloped LP [Romvos, 2014]
 Wry Trio, Wry CD [Clamshell Records, 2013]
 Balinese Beast / Fusiller LP [TanzProcesz, 2013]
 Balinese Beast / Wham Jah LP [Phase, 2012]
 Glacial - Hotel Costes Présente... . CD [Pschent, 2012]
 Balinese Beast, Balinese Beast LP [self-released, 2010]
 Balinese Beast, Soft Offerings Single [self-released, 2011]
 Balinese Beast / Thomas Beck Single [Wachsender Prozess, 2013]
 in Sonic Protest Compilation CD [Bimbo Tower, 2012]

References

External links
 Ilan Manouach personal website
 Shapereader Official website
 UbuWeb artist page

1980 births
Living people
Belgian artists
Belgian musicians
Greek emigrants to Belgium
Book publishers (people)
Conceptual artists